Jean-Pierre Hoffmann (2 June 1947 – 25 August 2006) was a Luxembourgian football midfielder.

References

1947 births
2006 deaths
Luxembourgian footballers
Jeunesse Esch players
Union Luxembourg players
Association football midfielders
Luxembourg international footballers